Miccolamia kaniei is a species of beetle in the family Cerambycidae. It was described by Takakuwa and N. Ohbayashi in 1992. It is known from Japan.

References

Desmiphorini
Beetles described in 1992